The Corbassière Glacier is a valley glacier in the Grand Combin massif in the Pennine Alps in southwestern Valais.

On the right side of the lower section of the glacier, the Cabane François-Xavier Bagnoud (2645 m above sea level) belonging to the Swiss Alpine Club is a starting point for ascents and glacier tours in the Grand Combin massif.

See also
List of glaciers in Switzerland
List of glaciers
Retreat of glaciers since 1850
Swiss Alps

External links
Swiss glacier monitoring network

Glaciers of Valais
Glaciers of the Alps
Bagnes